Lysimachia hybrida, common name Mississippi loosestrife or lowland yellow loosestrife, is a plant species widespread in much of the United States and Canada, absent only from the deserts in the west and the Arctic and sub-Arctic regions of the far north. It prefers moist locales such as marshes, swamps, wet meadows, stream banks, etc.

Lysimachia hybrida is a perennial herb up to 100 cm (40 inches) tall, spreading by means of underground rhizomes. Leaves are narrowly lanceolate or linear, up to 18 cm (7.2 inches) long. Flowers are yellow, borne mostly in the axils of the leaves.

References

hybrida
Flora of Canada
Flora of the United States
Taxa named by André Michaux